Franklin County is a county located in the U.S. state of Iowa. As of the 2020 census, the population was 10,019. The county seat is Hampton. The county was formed on January 15, 1851 and named after Benjamin Franklin.

Geography

Major highways
 Interstate 35
 U.S. Highway 65
 Iowa Highway 3
 Iowa Highway 57

Transit
 List of intercity bus stops in Iowa

Adjacent counties
Cerro Gordo County  (north)
Butler County  (east)
Hardin County  (south)
Wright County  (west)
Grundy County (southeast)

Demographics

2020 census
There were 4,656 housing units of which 4,141 were occupied.

2010 census
There were 4,894 housing units, of which 4,332 were occupied.

2000 census

As of the census of 2000, there were 10,704 people, 4,356 households, and 2,983 families residing in the county.  The population density was 18 people per square mile (7/km2).  There were 4,763 housing units at an average density of 8 per square mile (3/km2).  The racial makeup of the county was 94.92% White, 0.08% Black or African American, 0.23% Native American, 0.16% Asian, 0.02% Pacific Islander, 4.05% from other races, and 0.53% from two or more races.  6.00% of the population were Hispanic or Latino of any race.

There were 4,356 households, out of which 29.30% had children under the age of 18 living with them, 58.90% were married couples living together, 6.40% had a female householder with no husband present, and 31.50% were non-families. 27.60% of all households were made up of individuals, and 15.40% had someone living alone who was 65 years of age or older.  The average household size was 2.41 and the average family size was 2.93.

In the county, the population was spread out, with 24.20% under the age of 18, 7.30% from 18 to 24, 24.00% from 25 to 44, 23.90% from 45 to 64, and 20.50% who were 65 years of age or older.  The median age was 41 years. For every 100 females there were 96.40 males.  For every 100 females age 18 and over, there were 93.90 males.

The median income for a household in the county was $36,042, and the median income for a family was $45,184. Males had a median income of $29,694 versus $21,115 for females. The per capita income for the county was $18,767.  About 5.70% of families and 8.00% of the population were below the poverty line, including 9.70% of those under age 18 and 7.10% of those age 65 or over.

Franklin County Fair
Franklin County is home to the Franklin County Fair. Held annually for five days in mid-July, the Franklin County Fair is held on the fairgrounds located on the west side of Hampton. Traditionally, grandstand entertainment begins on Wednesday with the Barnes PRCA Rodeo. Thursday, Friday, and Saturday are usually concerts featuring nationally known entertainment. In 2007 such names as Terri Clark, Marshall Tucker Band, and Trent Tomlinson & Danielle Peck brought fans to the grandstand. On Sunday the Figure 8 Races generally fill the grandstand. The fair also includes free entertainment and a carnival midway. The fairgrounds features the Franklin County Historical Museum, Pleasant Hill (turn of the century village with stores, crafters, old west shows, music and entertainment), and Grandpa's Farm (all phases of farming demonstrated with vintage implements powered by draft horses, steam engines and antique tractors).

Education
There are four high schools in Franklin County. The Hampton-Dumont Community School District is a P/K-12 school system located in Hampton and serving the communities of Hampton, Dumont, Aredale, and Hansell. Hampton-Dumont has a K-12 enrollment of 1,194. The West Fork Community Schools are made up of a whole grade sharing agreement between SCMT and Rockwell-Swaledale. West Fork serves the communities of Sheffield, Chapin, Meservey, Thornton, Rockwell, and Swaledale and has a combined enrollment of 764 between the two districts. The AGWSR Community School District serves the communities of Ackley, Geneva, Wellsburg, and Steamboat Rock and has a K-12 enrollment of 654 students. The CAL Community School District, located just south of Latimer, serves the communities of Coulter, Alexander, and Latimer and has a K-12 enrollment of 274 students.

Communities

Cities

Ackley
Alexander
Coulter
Dows
Geneva
Hampton
Hansell
Latimer
Popejoy
Sheffield

Census-designated places
Bradford
Chapin

Townships
Franklin County is divided into sixteen townships:

 Geneva
 Grant
 Hamilton
 Ingham
 Lee
 Marion
 Morgan
 Mott
 Oakland
 Osceola
 Reeve
 Richland
 Ross
 Scott
 West Fork
 Wisner

Population ranking
The population ranking of the following table is based on the 2020 census of Franklin County.

† county seat

Politics

See also

National Register of Historic Places listings in Franklin County, Iowa
The Franklin County Courthouse in Hampton was built in 1891 and was listed on the National Register of Historic Places in 1976.

Notes

External links

Official Franklin County Government website
Franklin County Economic Development website
Franklin County Convention & Visitor's Bureau Website
Franklin County Fair

 
1851 establishments in Iowa
Populated places established in 1851